Cornești is a commune in Cluj County, Transylvania, Romania. It is composed of nine villages: Bârlea (Ónok), Cornești, Igriția (Kisigrice), Lujerdiu (Lózsárd), Morău (Móró), Stoiana (Esztény), Tiocu de Jos (Alsótök), Tiocu de Sus (Felsőtök), and Tioltiur (Tötör).

The commune lies on the banks of the river Lujerdiu.

Cornești borders the following communes: Bobâlna to the north, 
Dăbâca and Panticeu to the west, Iclod to the south, and Aluniș to the east.

Demographics
According to the census from 2002 there was a total population of 1,809 people living in this commune. Of this population, 83.80% are ethnic Romanians, 14.64% are ethnic Hungarians, and 1.54% ethnic Romani.

Notes

Communes in Cluj County
Localities in Transylvania